Force Fields At Home is the first album by Robert Pollard's solo project Teenage Guitar.

Tracklist 
All songs written and performed by Pollard, unless noted otherwise.
 Court Of Lions [Written: R.Pollard, Greg Demos - Drums: Greg Demos]
 Come See The Supermoon
 Current Pressings, Colors And Styles
 Still Downstairs
 8 Bars Of Meaningless Mathilda
 Harvest Whale
 Strangers For A Better Society
 It Takes A Great Promise
 It Doesn't Mean I'm Underground
 Baby Apple (Bass: Joe Patterson)
 Peter Pan Can
 Alice And Eddie (Fabulous Child Actors)
 Alfred Never [Written: R.Pollard, Greg Demos - Drums: Greg Demos]
 Gymnasium Politics
 Atlantic Cod
 Suburban Cycle Saccharine
 Post Card To Pinky
 Let Me

References 

2013 albums
Robert Pollard albums